Elizabeth Christie is a former Scottish international lawn and indoor bowler.

She won a gold medal in the fours at the 1985 World Outdoor Bowls Championship in Melbourne with Frances Whyte, Sarah Gourlay and Annette Evans.

References

Scottish female bowls players
Living people
Bowls World Champions
Date of birth missing (living people)
Year of birth missing (living people)